Glenarvon Huntley Armstrong (born 17 November 1969) is a former Australian cricketer who represented South Australia in Australian domestic cricket. He played as a right-handed middle-order batsman.

Armstrong was born in Hobart, Tasmania, but began his senior cricket career in Canberra (playing for the ACT cricket team), and eventually ended up in South Australia. At the 1988 Youth World Cup, he represented the Australian under-19s in all nine of their matches, including the final. Armstrong made his first-class debut for South Australia in January 1991, in a Sheffield Shield game against Victoria at the Junction Oval. Over the following two seasons, he made an additional four appearances, playing two Sheffield Shield fixtures against Western Australia and Mercantile Mutual Cup matches against Western Australia and Tasmania.

See also
 List of South Australian representative cricketers

References

External links
Player profile and statistics at Cricket Archive
Player profile and statistics at ESPNcricinfo

1969 births
Living people
Australian cricketers
Cricketers from Hobart
South Australia cricketers